The Lower Klamath National Wildlife Refuge is a National Wildlife Refuge of the United States on the border between California and Oregon. It is operated by the United States Fish and Wildlife Service. The refuge was designated a National Historic Landmark on October 16, 1965.

Lower Klamath National Wildlife Refuge, established by President Theodore Roosevelt in 1908, was the first waterfowl refuge in the United States. It is located in the Klamath Basin near Klamath Falls, Oregon. The refuge includes shallow freshwater marshes, open water, grassy uplands, and croplands that are intensively managed to provide foraging and breeding habitat for waterfowl and other animals. The market hunting of migratory birds in the late 19th century created the need for preservation and creation of a wildlife refuge.

Refuge objectives include the protection of habitat for flora and fauna, including migrating waterfowl, and preserving the biodiversity of the Klamath Basin. It works to integrate wetlands and sustainable agriculture and promote integrated pest management. The refuge provides wildlife-related public services, including education, hunting, and viewing and photography opportunities.

Avian species on the refuge include the bald eagle, golden eagle, American white pelican, white-faced ibis, snow goose, Ross's goose, greater white-fronted goose, Canada goose, peregrine falcon, northern pintail, mallard, gadwall, canvasback, western grebe, eared grebe, black tern, and tricolored blackbird.

Conservation and management activities include the maintenance of a local water infrastructure and the monitoring of the interaction between agriculture and habitat. Issues in focus include the loss of wetland habitat, the degradation of water quality, drought, and water rights.

Gallery

See also 
 List of largest National Wildlife Refuges
 List of National Wildlife Refuges
 Volcanic Legacy Scenic Byway

References

External links 

National Wildlife Refuges in Oregon
National Wildlife Refuges in California
National Historic Landmarks in Oregon
National Historic Landmarks in California
Protected areas of Siskiyou County, California
Wetlands of Oregon
National Register of Historic Places in Klamath County, Oregon
Protected areas of Klamath County, Oregon
1908 establishments in Oregon
Wetlands of California
Landforms of Siskiyou County, California
Landforms of Klamath County, Oregon
National Register of Historic Places in Siskiyou County, California
Protected areas established in 1908
1908 establishments in California